Milica Šljukić (born 29 May 1996) is a Montenegrin tennis player.

Šljukić career high singles ranking is world No. 1,186, which she achieved on 30 September 2013.

Playing for Montenegro at the Fed Cup, Šljukić has a win–loss record of 0–2.

National representation

Fed Cup
Šljukić made her Fed Cup debut for Montenegro in 2012, while the team was competing in the Europe/Africa Zone Group II, when she was 15 years and 327 days old.

Fed Cup (0–2)

Doubles (0–2)

References

External links
 
 
 

1996 births
Living people
Montenegrin female tennis players